Morris Flewwelling,  (born June 2, 1941) was the mayor of the City of Red Deer, Alberta, from 2004 to 2013. He was a long time alderman on Red Deer City Council prior to being elected mayor.

References 

Mayors of Red Deer, Alberta
1941 births
Living people
Members of the Alberta Order of Excellence
Members of the Order of Canada
21st-century Canadian politicians